Raymond Boudon (27 January 1934 – 10 April 2013) was a sociologist, philosopher and Professor in the Paris-Sorbonne University.

Career
With Alain Touraine, Michel Crozier and Pierre Bourdieu, Raymond Boudon is one of the leading French sociologists of the last quarter of the 20th century. He is known for his research on social mobility and inequality of opportunities as well as for his defense of methodological individualism.

He was a member of many important institutions. Académie des Sciences morales et politiques, Academia Europaea, British Academy, American Academy of Arts and Sciences, International Academy of Human Sciences of St Petersburg, Central European Academy of Arts and Sciences. And a fellow at the Center for Advanced Study in the Behavioral Sciences and an invited professor notably at Harvard, Oxford University, and the Universities of Geneva, Chicago, and Stockholm.

A biographical study of him by Jean-Michel Morin was published in 2006.

Selected publications
 The Uses of Structuralism (1971)
 Education, Opportunity and Social Inequality (1974)
 The Logic of Social Action (1981)
 Theories of Social Change (1986)
 The Analysis of Ideology (1989)
 The Art of Self-Persuasion (1994)
 The Origin of Values (2000)

Notes

References
E. Di Nuoscio, "Le ragioni degli individui. L'individualismo metodologico di Raymond Boudon", Rubbettino, Roma 1996

External links
 Raymond Boudon's profile at Paris-Sorbonne University (Paris IV) 

École Normale Supérieure alumni
Fellows of Nuffield College, Oxford
Members of the Académie des sciences morales et politiques
Members of Academia Europaea
Academic staff of the University of Paris
Harvard University staff
1934 births
2013 deaths
French sociologists
Commanders of the Ordre national du Mérite
French male writers